Liushan Subdistrict is a subdistrict in Xinfu District, Fushun, Liaoning province, China. , it has ten residential neighborhoods under its administration:
Hudielou Community
Jianyifang Community
Xinliushan Community
Xinzhou Community
Antai Community
Shengdi Community
Hubian Community
Shiyichangzhuzhai Community
Huayuan Community
Sanli Community

See also 
 List of township-level divisions of Liaoning

References 

Township-level divisions of Liaoning
Fushun